Veselin Petkov Gerov (born 7 May 1970) is a Bulgarian former professional footballer who played as a striker, mostly in Germany.

References

External links

Living people
1970 births
Sportspeople from Pleven
Bulgarian footballers
Association football forwards
FC Spartak Plovdiv players
FC Etar 1924 Veliko Tarnovo players
FC Lokomotiv 1929 Sofia players
Botev Plovdiv players
SC Paderborn 07 players
Rot Weiss Ahlen players
Kickers Offenbach players
SV Sandhausen players
KSV Hessen Kassel players
First Professional Football League (Bulgaria) players
2. Bundesliga players
Regionalliga players